Dr. K. N. Modi University is located in Newai, Tonk, Rajasthan, India. The university has a  campus. The periphery around the campus has a green buffer of heavy plantation, which filters out dust and noise from the vicinity and helps in maintaining pleasant surroundings. Rainwater harvesting system has been adopted. Waste water is recycled for horticultural needs. Solar energy panels supplement power generation; provide hot water in winters and street light at night. An in-house sub-station is operational.

References

External links

Private universities in India
Educational institutions established in 2010
2010 establishments in Rajasthan
Universities in Rajasthan
Tonk district